The 2nd TVyNovelas Awards, is an Academy of special awards to the best of soap operas and TV shows for the last year. The awards ceremony took place in 1984 in the Mexico City.

Summary of awards and nominations

Winners and nominees

Novelas

Others

References 

TVyNovelas Awards
1984 in Mexico
1984 television awards